Davindra Krishna (born 18 December 1981) is a Trinidadian cricketer. He played in three first-class matches for Trinidad and Tobago in 2004.

See also
 List of Trinidadian representative cricketers

References

External links
 

1981 births
Living people
Trinidad and Tobago cricketers